Algol was an avant-garde Catalan magazine edited by the artistic group Dau al Set and first published in 1947. It was founded by Joan Pons and Joan Brossa and edited by Enric Tomo i Freixes. Only 100 copies of Algol were published which all appeared in 1947. The 12-page magazine was printed on guarro, a type of linen paper.

Dau al Set was formed by the poet Joan Brossa, the philosopher Arnau Puig and the painters Joan Pons, Antoni Tàpies, Modest Cuixart and Joan-Josep Tharrats. It was a very important group in the Spanish post-war era. The magazine included literary texts by Brossa and Puig and illustrations by Pons, Jordi Mercadé and Francesc Boadella.

The group later published another magazine, called Dau al Set after their own name, which was the sequel to Algol. Dau al Set was first published in 1948 and had a total of 56 pages. It also contained works by Brossa, Puig, and many other artists.

See also
 List of avant-garde magazines

References

External links
 Digitalization available in the ARCA Portal (archive of antique Catalan magazines)
Ainize González García, "Nota sobre la revista Algol", Els Marges, No. 90, Winter 2010, pp. 68-79. (in Catalan)

1947 establishments in Spain
1947 disestablishments in Spain
Avant-garde magazines
Catalan-language magazines
Defunct magazines published in Spain
Magazines established in 1947
Magazines disestablished in 1947
Magazines published in Catalonia
Visual arts magazines